Shudharil Shudhan is a 2009 Malayalam-language film by debutant director Jayaraj Vijay, starring Mukesh, Kalabhavan Mani and Indrans.

The film is about  an estate worker named Ramankutty (Indrans) who is forced to lead a strike against the estate management, leaving his family in starvation.

Cast
 Mukesh as Mohanachandran Pilla
 Lakshmi Sharma as Janaki
 Indrans as Ramankunju
 Kalabhavan Mani as Sankarankutty
 Sudheesh as Chandran
Sai Kumar as Joseph
 Mamukkoya as Jabbar
Maniyanpilla Raju as Kanaran
 T. G. Ravi as Patta Krishnan
 Kollam Thulasi as Fernandez
 Geetha Vijayan as Ramani
 Sona Nair as Panki
 Manasi

Songs
The film has five songs which were composed by Jaison J. Nair. The songs were written by Vayalar Sarath Chandra Varma and Inchakkadu Balachandran.

References

External links
 Movies.rediff.com

2009 films
2000s Malayalam-language films